Al-Zawraa Sports Club is an Iraqi sports club based in Utayfia, Karkh District (near Tigris River), Baghdad. Their football team compete in the Iraqi Premier League, the top-flight of Iraqi football.
The team has had 63 coaches.

References

Al-Zawraa